Davidoff  may refer to:

 Davidoff, a Swiss tobacco brand
 Zino Davidoff Group, a Swiss luxury goods brand
 Davidoff (surname)

See also
 Davidoff Swiss Indoors
 Davidov (disambiguation)
 Davydov